Emanuela Romano is an Italian Paralympic swimmer who competes in international level events. She has won three medals at the 2013 IPC Swimming World Championships in Montreal, a bronze medalist at the 2016 IPC Swimming European Championships and has competed at the 2012 and 2016 Summer Paralympics. She also holds the Italian record for the 100m backstroke in her sports category.

References

Living people
Swimmers from Naples
Paralympic swimmers of Italy
Italian female backstroke swimmers
Italian female freestyle swimmers
Swimmers at the 2012 Summer Paralympics
Swimmers at the 2016 Summer Paralympics
Medalists at the World Para Swimming Championships
Medalists at the World Para Swimming European Championships
Year of birth missing (living people)
S6-classified Paralympic swimmers
21st-century Italian women